The Symphony No. 59 in A major is a relatively early work by Joseph Haydn that is known popularly as the Fire Symphony. Composed under the auspices of Nikolaus Esterházy, it was written in the middle or late 1760s.

Date of composition
Despite its high number, the symphony is one of several in the Hoboken classification system (Symphony No. 72 is another good example, as it was composed even earlier) that is unsympathetically misplaced. It is, in fact, a moderately early work, certainly composed before 1769, and possibly as early as 1765. Stylistically it should probably be numbered among the 30s, also composed around this time. By contrast, the next symphony in Hoboken’s catalogue, Symphony No. 60, was written in the mid-1770s.

The date of its first performance is unknown, as is the case with most of Haydn's symphonies.

Nickname (Fire)
The symphony has long been popularly known as the Feuer or Fire symphony. As with most other monikers attached to Haydn's symphonies, the name itself did not originate with the composer. For a long time, the attributed title was thought to refer to the fiery nature of the composition, particularly the rather unusually spirited first movement (marked Presto, a tempo indication more typical of final movements) and the brief but energetic last movement, which features prominent horn fanfares and coruscating runs on the strings. However, there is nothing particularly distinguishing about any of the movements that would make it more impassioned than other symphonic compositions by Haydn during this period.

Instead, the nickname almost certainly derives from the use of several movements as accompanying music to a performance of the play Die Feuersbrunst by Gustav Friedrich Wilhelm Großmann, which was performed at Eszterháza in either (depending on the source) 1774 or 1778. An extant manuscript of the symphony dating from Haydn's lifetime bears the title Feuer Sinfonia. This play performance likely accounts for the symphony’s misnumbering immediately before the Symphony No. 60 Il Distratto), which is derived from music composed 1774-5 to accompany a German-language performance of Jean-François Regnard’s play Le Distrait (Il Distratto in Italian). However, claims that symphony 59 originated first as theatre music are unproven, despite curiously theatrical elements such as the sudden horn fanfares towards the close of the second movement.

Movements

The work is in standard four movement form and scored for two oboes, two horns, continuo (bassoon, harpsichord) and strings.

Presto, 
Andante o più tosto Allegretto, 
Menuet e Trio, 
Finale: Allegro

The opening movement starts off energetically on an upbeat followed by octave drop. Following the initial outburst, the music dramatically relaxes and comes to a full stop. This was a technique he used to an even greater effect in his 48th symphony from about the same time period. The relaxation also appears at the end of the movement giving the listener the quiet curtain raising music that often occurs at the end of an opera overture.

In the slow movement, the winds are silent for most of the movement—leaving the listener to expect that the movement is scored for strings alone. These expectations are quelled when full orchestration enters for the second theme in the recapitulation.

Haydn rarely used the same meter for consecutive movements as he did with the inner two movements in this work. There are melodic links between these movements, both in A minor, as well as both start with the same sequence of pitches. The second theme of the slow movement is also alluded to.

The finale begins with a horn call followed by a response in the oboes and at the end of the exposition it is the strings and oboe that have a dialogue. Haydn uses a similar horn call to start the finale of his 103rd symphony over twenty-five years later. Following a brief development, the return of the horn call is only hinted at in the strings in the start of the recapitulation which then follows in a relatively straightforward manner. The horn call in its proper instrumentation is saved for the movement coda.

See also
List of symphonies with names

References

External links
 
 "Haydn’s Symphony No. 59, The Fire" by Timothy Judd, The Listeners Club, 20 November 2019
 
 , Frankfurt Radio Symphony, Andrés Orozco-Estrada conducting; Alte Oper Frankfurt (2014)

Symphony 059
Compositions in A major
1760s compositions